Sofronovo is a rural locality (a village) in Argunovskoye Rural Settlement, Nikolsky District, Vologda Oblast, Russia. The population was 38 as of 2002.

Geography 
Sofronovo is located 46 km northwest of Nikolsk (the district's administrative centre) by road. Dyachkovo is the nearest rural locality.

References 

Rural localities in Nikolsky District, Vologda Oblast